Stoewer was a German automobile manufacturer before World War II whose headquarters were in Stettin (Now Szczecin, Poland).

History
The first company was founded by the Stoewer brothers, Emil (lived 1873 - 1942) and Bernhard (1875 - 1937) in 1896 for manufacturing sewing machines in Stettin.

In 1899, the Stoewer brothers founded the firm Gebrüder Stoewer, Fabrik für Motorfahrzeugen and started to produce automobiles. Their first automobile was the Großer Stoewer Motorwagen, with 6.5 hp (4.8 kW) and  maximum speed.

In 1908 Stoewers constructed the Stoewer G4. This model was successful for them at the time - 1070 cars were built. In 1910, Stoewer cars were built under licence by Mathis of Strassburg.
In 1916, the family-owned company was transformed into a limited company under the name of Stoewer-Werke AG, vormals Gebrüder Stoewer.

In the mid-20s a new class of cars was introduced: the D-Types included D3, D9 and D10 with four-cylinder engines, as well as D5, D6 and D12 with six cylinders.
Of the fifty "D10" made, the only survivor was in Melbourne, Australia in original condition. It was on display at the 2014 MotorClassica. It is now in Germany.

In 1928 the company started to build S8 and G14 models with eight-cylinder engines.
At the beginning of the 1930s Stoewers delivered their highlights: G15 Gigant, M12 Marschall and P20 Repräsentant, each with eight-cylinder engines, with 60 to 120 hp (45 to 90 kW) and  maximum speed. The production of these cars had to be cancelled after 2,500 vehicles being produced due to worldwide economic troubles. In 1931 Stoewer constructed one of the first cars with front-wheel drive at all, class V5 25 hp (19 kW),  maximum speed. The model named Greif Junior was built under the licence of Tatra. Its successor V8 Greif was the last car constructed by Mr Stoewer himself; class Arkona and Sedina were the last civilian cars produced by the company.

In 1936 the Stoewer factory developed the 'uniform light off-road car' (le.E.Pkw, leichter geländegängiger Einheits-PKW) for the German army, a versatile four-wheel drive car, the Stoewer R200 initially (until 1940) equipped with four-wheel steering. Due to capacity-limitations, the cars also had to be produced by BMW-Factory Eisenach, as BMW 325, and by Hanomag in Hanover as the Type 20B. Together the three manufacturers made a total of ca. 13,000 units. 
Stoewer was one of several German companies that exploited slave labour during WW II and had its own camp for prisoners.
After World War II, the Red Army seized the remaining production facilities, dismantled the factory and sent the equipment to the Soviet Union. The company subsequently ceased to exist.

Passenger car models

See also
Einheits-PKW der Wehrmacht
GAZ-69

References

External links
 Stoewer Museum
 

Vehicle manufacturing companies established in 1896
Defunct motor vehicle manufacturers of Germany
History of Szczecin
Companies of Prussia
Vehicle manufacturing companies disestablished in 1945
1896 establishments in Germany
1945 disestablishments in Germany
Companies involved in the Holocaust
Companies based in Szczecin